The Abaganars are (Khalkha-Mongolian:Авга нар/Avga nar) a  Southern Mongolian sub-ethnic group in Inner Mongolia of China.

See also 
 Administrative divisions of Northern Yuan Dynasty
 Demographics of China
 List of medieval Mongolian tribes and clans
 List of Mongolian monarchs
 Mongols in China
 Northern Mongolia
 Western Mongolia

Southern Mongols
Mongols